David Stow Adam (9 February 1859 – 31 January 1925) was a Scottish minister and professor.

David was born near Langside in Glasgow to George Adam and Jane, both schoolteachers. He matriculated to the University of Glasgow in 1874, receiving a Master of Arts degree in 1881 and a Bachelor of Divinity in 1884. He also studied at Erlangen University. Between 1881 and 1884, he taught logic and metaphysics at the University of Glasgow, later teaching Hebrew at Free Church Training College between 1885 and 1886.

In 1886, Adam was ordained a minister of the Free Church of Scotland. He would marry Grace Paterson in 1890, having five sons and one daughter with her. In 1907, Adam was appointed chair of systematic theology and church history at Ormond College, being inducted on 11 March. Following his appointment, the college adopted a more progressive approach. While chair, he would become a pioneer in Australian ecumenism, being president of the National Council of Churches in Australia in 1910. He was awarded an honorary Doctor of Divinity degree from the University of Glasgow on 25 June 1912.

In 1916, Adam served as a Chaplain 4th Class of the Hospital Transport Corps in the First Australian Imperial Force. In 1924, he left Australia with his wife in order to see his daughter in China; he also planned to see Christianity in Asia. While in Canton, China, he contracted typhoid fever and pneumonia, dying on 31 January 1925.

References

19th-century Ministers of the Free Church of Scotland
Academics from Glasgow
Alumni of the University of Glasgow
Academics of the University of Glasgow
Academic staff of the University of Melbourne
19th-century Scottish theologians
1859 births
1925 deaths